Pulak may refer to:

First Name
Pulak Bandyopadhyay (1931–1999), Indian Bengali lyricist and songwriter
Pulak Biswas (1941–2013), Indian children's book illustrator
Pulak Sengupta (born in 1963), Indian petrologist and professor

Toponyme
Pulak Rud Pey, village of Mazandaran Province, Iran
Pa Pulak, village of Lorestan Province, Iran